Edwin Lee Mathews (October 13, 1931 – February 18, 2001) was an American Major League Baseball (MLB) third baseman. He played 17 seasons for Boston / Milwaukee / Atlanta Braves (1952–1966); Houston Astros (1967) and Detroit Tigers (1967–68). Inducted into the National Baseball Hall of Fame in 1978, he is the only player to have represented the Braves in the three American cities they have called home. He played 1,944 games for the Braves during their 13-season tenure in Milwaukee—the prime of Mathews' career.

Mathews is regarded as one of the best third basemen ever to play the game. He was an All-Star for nine seasons. He won the National League (NL) home run title in 1953 and 1959 and was the NL Most Valuable Player runner-up both of those seasons. He hit 512 home runs during his major league career. Mathews coached for the Atlanta Braves in 1971, and he was the team's manager from 1972 to 1974. Later, he was a scout and coach for the Texas Rangers, Milwaukee Brewers, and Oakland Athletics.

Early years
Mathews was born in Texarkana, Texas. He was six years old when his family moved to Santa Barbara, California. The Santa Barbara High School baseball field, where he developed into a star high school baseball player, is named after him. Mathews was signed by the Boston Braves in 1949. He played 63 games that year for the Class D High Point-Thomasville Hi-Toms, where he hit 17 home runs and earned a .363 batting average. The next year he hit 32 home runs for the Class AA Atlanta Crackers.

MLB career

Boston, Milwaukee, and Atlanta Braves
 Mathews was brought up to the major leagues in 1952, where he hit 25 home runs, including three in one game versus Brooklyn on September 27. In 1953 the Braves moved to Milwaukee, Wisconsin where he batted .302 and posted career highs of 47 home runs and 135 RBIs. For nine straight seasons he hit at least 30 home runs, including leading the National League twice (1953, 1959).

As one of 1954's superstars in American sports, Mathews was chosen for the cover of the first-ever issue of Sports Illustrated magazine. Around this time, Ty Cobb said of Mathews: "I've only known three or four perfect swings in my time. This lad has one of them." Mathews was a powerful pull hitter, and for many years of his career teams would implement the "Mathews shift" when he came to bat. The second baseman would shift well to his left, toward first base, and the shortstop would come to the second base side of the bag, leaving a gaping hole between second and third base. Mathews delighted in occasionally punching the ball through that hole.

The Braves won the 1957 National League championship. In the World Series, Mathews hit a game-winning home run in the tenth inning of game four. The Braves went on to defeat the New York Yankees to win the Series. Mathews made the final putout of the Series, a forceout of Gil McDougald on Moose Skowron's hard-hit grounder.

 Mathews was regarded as one of the strongest power hitters of his time, often being compared to American League contemporary Mickey Mantle, in terms of power hitting strength. Hall of Fame teammate Warren Spahn once said of the two: "Mathews is just as strong as Mantle. They don't hit the same – Mantle gets all of his weight into his swing; Mathews uses his wrists more." Spahn's comment on Mathews' use of his wrists was in reference to his unique swing, as believed by many to be one of the more graceful swings in baseball history. Pitcher Sal Maglie noticed, however, that Mathews had a tendency to chase "the low curve on the three-and-two pitch." Mathews is the only player to play for the Braves in Boston, Milwaukee, and Atlanta, and the last Boston Brave still on an active roster.

Mathews is also one of just two players to homer with a teammate in the same game at least 50 times with two different teammates.  He did this with Henry Aaron 75 times and with Joe Adcock 56 times. Willie Mays is the other, with Willie McCovey (68) and Orlando Cepeda (50), to do it.

Between 1954 and 1966, he and Braves teammate Hank Aaron hit 863 home runs (Aaron 442, Mathews 421), moving ahead of the Yankees duo of Babe Ruth and Lou Gehrig as the all-time leaders in major league history.

Houston Astros and Detroit Tigers
The Braves traded Mathews, Arnold Umbach, and a player to be named later to the Houston Astros for Dave Nicholson and Bob Bruce after the 1966 season. In 1967, Mathews became the seventh player to hit 500 career home runs, becoming a member of the 500 home run club on July 14 coming off pitcher Juan Marichal of the San Francisco Giants at Candlestick Park. During the 1967 season, Mathews was traded from the Astros to the Detroit Tigers. His final appearances came in two games of the 1968 World Series, as the Tigers defeated the St. Louis Cardinals.

Upon his retirement, he was sixth in all-time home runs with 512. Over his career, he was named to the All-Star team twelve times (MLB held two All-Star Games from 1959 through 1962), played in three World Series, and drove in 100 or more runs five times.  He never won an MVP award (finishing second twice, behind Roy Campanella in 1953 and behind Ernie Banks in 1959), although he did win the NL Player of the Month award in September 1959 (.303, 11 HR, 25 RBI).

Career statistics
In 2391 games over 17 seasons, Mathews posted a .271 batting average (2315-for-8537) with 1509 runs, 354 doubles, 72 triples, 512 home runs, 1453 RBI, 68 stolen bases, 1444 bases on balls, .376 on-base percentage and .509 slugging percentage. He finished his career with a .959 fielding percentage playing primarily at third base but also at first base and right field. In 16 World Series games, he batted .200 (10-for-50) with 7 runs, 5 doubles, 1 home run, 7 RBI, 1 stolen base and 15 walks.

Coaching and managing
In 1971, Mathews became a coach, and then in the midseason of 1972, manager of the Atlanta Braves. Mathews is one of the few players to play, coach, and manage for the same baseball team. The Braves were 47–57 under Lum Harris and in fourth place in the National League West Division when Mathews took command on August 7. The 1972 Braves finished 23–27 under Mathews as manager, ending up 25 games behind the Cincinnati Reds. The 1973 Braves then finished fifth (76–85), 22 games out of first place.

Mathews was the Braves' manager when Hank Aaron hit his 715th home run on April 8, 1974. But on July 21, 1974, Mathews was fired when the team went into a slump and fell into fourth place with a 50–49 record. Aaron and Darrell Evans both criticized the decision to terminate Mathews. Evans said that Mathews was a friend and Aaron said that the decision was "a blow to me." Mathews said that the Braves indicated that there would be a job for him within the organization, but he said he was not sure what he would do next. The Braves went 149–161 (.481) during Mathews' time at the helm.

After retirement

Mathews was elected to the Wisconsin Athletic Hall of Fame in 1976. In 1978, Mathews was elected to the National Baseball Hall of Fame. He ranks second all-time among MLB third basemen in home runs, runs batted in, slugging percentage, and total bases.

In 1982, Mathews was a minor league baseball instructor for the Oakland Athletics when a spot was found on his lung. He was ultimately admitted to the hospital to investigate it. Doctors ruled out cancer, but Mathews was diagnosed with tuberculosis. He was treated and returned to his work with the Oakland organization.

In 1999, The Sporting News ranked Mathews 63 on their list of  100, "Baseball's Greatest Players". He was also nominated that year as a finalist for the Major League Baseball All-Century Team.

Personal life
Mathews was married to Virjean Lauby in 1954 and they divorced in 1970. He was married and divorced a second time, then married Elizabeth Busch Burke, daughter of brewing executive Gussie Busch, in 1977.

Sportswriter Bob Wolf of the Milwaukee Journal indicated that Mathews' election to the Baseball Hall of Fame may have been delayed because of his cool relationship with the media. Mathews seemed to resent the intrusion of reporters in his personal life, especially early in his career. He gestured with his fist at a reporter when he was in court on charges of reckless driving. He was angered by the presence of the media at his 1954 wedding ceremony at a county clerk's office.

Death
In February 2001, Mathews died from complications of pneumonia in La Jolla, California, and was buried in Santa Barbara Cemetery. Later that year during the baseball season, the Atlanta Braves honored Mathews with the placement of patches bearing his retired uniform number, 41, on their jerseys.

See also

 Houston Astros award winners and league leaders
 List of Major League Baseball home run records
 List of Major League Baseball career home run leaders
 500 home run club
 List of Major League Baseball career hits leaders
 List of Major League Baseball career runs scored leaders
 List of Major League Baseball career runs batted in leaders
 List of Major League Baseball career total bases leaders
 List of Major League Baseball annual home run leaders

Notes

References

External links

Eddie Mathews at SABR (Baseball BioProject)
Audio: Matthews' 500th career home run as called by Harry Kalas in 1967
A Glimpse of Eddie Mathews in 1989 at Seamheads

1931 births
2001 deaths
American sportsmen
Atlanta Braves coaches
Atlanta Braves managers
Atlanta Braves players
Atlanta Crackers players
Baseball players from Texas
Boston Braves players
Detroit Tigers players
High Point-Thomasville Hi-Toms players
Houston Astros players
Deaths from pneumonia in California
People from Santa Barbara, California
People from Texarkana, Texas
Major League Baseball first base coaches
Major League Baseball players with retired numbers
Major League Baseball third basemen
Milwaukee Braves players
Milwaukee Brewers (minor league) players
Milwaukee Brewers scouts
National Baseball Hall of Fame inductees
National League All-Stars
National League home run champions
Oakland Athletics scouts
Baseball players from San Diego
Sportspeople from Santa Barbara, California
Texas Rangers scouts
Burials at Santa Barbara Cemetery